Solid Ice is a 1996 video game developed by Strategy First and published by Empire Interactive.

Development
The game was announced in June 1996.The company spent about $750,000 on the game, including a "substancial" amount paid to the National Hockey League Players' Association to use player names and statistics.

Reception

GameSpot rated the game a 4 of 10 stating "If you're looking for a good, solid hockey simulation, pass on this one - it certainly isn't enough to hold a true fan's interest for long"

Gorden Goble from Computer Gaming World reviewed the game stating "A fascinating but flawed look at PC hockey, SOLID ICE should be noted for the things it does right. Hearty recommendations, however, will have to wait until next time.

References

1996 video games
DOS games
DOS-only games
Ice hockey video games
Side-scrolling video games
Strategy First games
Video games developed in Canada
Empire Interactive games